Tatara was a clan of Manchu nobility. After the demise of the dynasty, some of its descendants sinicized their clan name to the Chinese surnames Tang (唐), Tan (譚), Shu (舒) or Song (松).

Notable figures

Males
 Inggūldai (1596–1648)
 Tanbai (d. 1650), political figure
 Sunahai (d. 1666), minister
 E'ersun (额尔孙)
 Suringga (d. 1799), minister of justice
 Qinghai (慶海/庆海), a sixth rank literary official (主事, pinyin: zhushi), father of Imperial Noble Consort Zhuangjing
 Yutai (裕泰), the Viceroy of Shaan-Gan in 1851
 Zhirui (1852–1911), political figure

 Prince Consort

Females
Imperial Consort
 Imperial Noble Consort
 Imperial Noble Consort Zhuangjing (1837–1890), the Xianfeng Emperor's consort, the mother of Princess Rong'an (1855–1875)
 Imperial Noble Consort Wenjing (1873–1924), the Guangxu Emperor's consort
 Imperial Noble Consort Keshun (1876–1900), the Guangxu Emperor's consort
 Noble Consort Mingxian (1920–1942), Puyi's noble lady

Princess Consort
 Primary Consort
 Yunki's first primary consort
 Shixia (1904–1993), Pujie's first wife

 Secondary Consort
 Yongxing's secondary consort, the mother of sixth daughter (1793–1794) and Mianbin (1796–1841)

See also
List of Manchu clans

References
 

Manchu clans
Bordered Red Banner